The Prison Reform Trust (PRT) was founded in 1981 in London, England, by a small group of prison reform campaigners who were unhappy with the direction in which the Howard League for Penal Reform was heading, concentrating more on community punishments than on traditional prison reform issues. Founding members included Sir Monty Finniston and Veronica Linklater.

PRT offers advice and information to thousands of people every year: prisoners, their families, prison and probation staff, the legal profession, students, academics and interested members of the public. PRT organise an annual lecture (delivered by Charles Clarke MP, Home Secretary, in 2005), and a range of conferences and seminars which attract high-profile speakers and large audiences.

The Prison Reform Trust carries out research on all aspects of prison. Recent studies include: prisoners' views on prison education, the mental health needs of women prisoners, older prisoners, prisoner councils, foreign national prisoners, prisoner votes, and a report into how sentencers make the decision to imprison offenders.

Stephen Shaw was Director of PRT from 1981 to 1999, when he became the Prisons and Probation Ombudsman for England and Wales. He was succeeded as Director by Juliet Lyon.

Sir Monty Finniston was succeeded as Chair by the former Cabinet Minister, Edmund Dell, broadcaster and journalist, Jon Snow. Lord Douglas Hurd, the former Home Secretary and Foreign Secretary, succeeded Jon Snow as PRT's fourth chair in November 1997. Robert Fellowes, a crossbench peer, who has served as Private Secretary to Queen Elizabeth II, and holds a senior position at Barclays plc succeeded Douglas Hurd in September 2001.

See also 
Addaction
Centre for Crime and Justice Studies
Centre for Mental Health
Centre for Social Justice
Nacro
Revolving Doors Agency

References

External links
Prison Reform Trust
Howard League for Penal Reform

Organizations established in 1981
Prison charities based in the United Kingdom
Charities based in London
Prison reform
1981 establishments in the United Kingdom
Reform in the United Kingdom